Bagpiper may refer to:

 A person who plays bagpipes
 Bagpiper (whisky), a brand of Indian whisky

See also
 List of bagpipers